Gymnochthebius fossatus is a species of minute moss beetle in the family Hydraenidae. It is found in the Caribbean Sea, Central America, North America, and South America.

References

Further reading

 

Staphylinoidea
Articles created by Qbugbot
Beetles described in 1855